Florence Bay is a suburb of Magnetic Island in the City of Townsville, Queensland, Australia. In the  Florence Bay had a population of 0 people.

History 
Florence Bay was once the site of a private guesthouse reachable only by boat. One of these vessels, The 'Magnet' was carrying a picnic party from Florence Bay when it struck a reef on 25 March 1917 and was subsequently sunk.

After the demise of the guesthouse (reputably due to cyclone damage - unable to verify this), the property passed into the care of the Scout Association and became the main youth training facility in North Queensland.

A group within the Scout Association was recognised for their work to develop the facilities - including a storehouse, pump and well, parade ground, camping area and secluded chapel - by being awarded the title "Florence Bay Rover Crew". It is notable that much of their work was done by hand, including carrying bricks, cement, timber and equipment in on their backs from either the main road or Radical Bay moorings.

The chapel, set high on the hillside, is consecrated and contains the cremated remains of one of North Queensland's most notable early Scouting leaders, "Beaver" Masters.

On the headland at the south end of Florence Bay there remains the base of a World War Two searchlight tower, along with a command and anti-aircraft installation at "the forts" above the bay.

In the  Florence Bay had a population of 0 people.

Education 
There are no schools in Florence Bay. The nearest primary school is in Nelly Bay on the island. The nearest secondary school is Townsville State High School in Railway Estate in the Townsville mainland.

References

External links 

 

Suburbs of Townsville
Magnetic Island